Swedish national road 13, is a Swedish national road in Skåne in southern Sweden between Ystad and Ängelholm, through Höör and Klippan. The length of the road is 131 km (81 mi).

References

National road 13